Rudolf Gustav Moritz Bacherer (19 June 1895  – 6 July 1964) was a German officer during World War II who held several regimental commands. He was also a recipient of the  Knight's Cross of the Iron Cross with Oak Leaves. 

In June 1944 Bacherer was commanding the 1049th Infantry Regiment on the Western Front when Major General Rudolf Stegmann, commander of the 77th Infantry Division was killed in American air raid. Bacherer was promoted to command the division and enjoyed some early successes, capturing 250 American prisoners on 17 June and the following day broke through US lines to link up with the remnants of the LXXXIV Corps near La Haye-du-Puits. The Division however, which was already understrength when Bacherer made his advance soon suffered heavy losses as the Americans forged ahead. Bacherer was captured by American forces following the fall of Saint-Malo in 1944 and was held as a POW until 1947.

Awards
 Iron Cross (1914) 1st Class
 German Cross in Gold on 29 January 1942 as Rittmeister in Aufklärungs-Abteilung 156
 Knight's Cross of the Iron Cross with Oak Leaves
 Knight's Cross on 30 October 1943 as Oberst and commander of Grenadier-Regiment 234
 550th Oak Leaves on 11 August 1944 as Oberst and commander of Grenadier-Regiment 1049

References

Citations

Bibliography

 
 
 

1895 births
1964 deaths
Military personnel from Pforzheim
German Army personnel of World War I
Recipients of the clasp to the Iron Cross, 1st class
Recipients of the Gold German Cross
Recipients of the Knight's Cross of the Iron Cross with Oak Leaves
German prisoners of war in World War II held by the United States
People from the Grand Duchy of Baden